Phak Khuang is a village and tambon (sub-district) of Thong Saen Khan District, in Uttaradit Province, Thailand. In 2005 it had a population of 9198 people. The tambon contains 14 villages.

References

Tambon of Uttaradit province
Populated places in Uttaradit province